Olympia Eishalle (originally known as Eisstadion am Oberwiesenfeld) is an indoor sporting arena located in Munich, Germany. It is used for various indoor events and is the home arena of the ice hockey team EHC München now playing in the Deutsche Eishockey Liga (previously it played in 2nd Bundesliga and lower leagues). The capacity of the arena is 6,256 spectators.

External links
Venue information

Indoor arenas in Germany
Indoor ice hockey venues in Germany
Sports venues in Munich